Austin Roy Grimes (September 11, 1893 – September 13, 1954) was an American second baseman in Major League Baseball who played briefly for the New York Giants in 1920. Grimes batted and threw right-handed. He was born in Bergholz, Ohio.

In a one-season career, Grimes posted a .158 batting average (9-for-57) and three runs batted in with no home runs in 26 games played. Grimes played 20 years in the minor leagues, from 1913 to 1932.  In the five seasons from 1923 through 1927, Grimes batted .335 for the Columbus Senators and Toledo Mud Hens of the American Association, a league on the top rung of the minors.

Grimes died in Guilford Township, Ohio, at age 61.

Family
Grimes was the twin brother of first baseman Ray Grimes and uncle of infielder Oscar Grimes, also with major league experience. A third brother, Kenneth Grimes, was a teammate of Roy and Ray in the minor leagues.

External links

1893 births
1954 deaths
Major League Baseball second basemen
New York Giants (NL) players
Akron Tyrites players
Bridgeport Americans players
Buffalo Bisons (minor league) players
Chattanooga Lookouts players
Columbus Senators players
Durham Bulls players
Hartford Senators players
Kansas City Blues players
Memphis Chickasaws players
Mobile Bears players
Oakland Oaks (baseball) players
Toledo Mud Hens players
Victoria Bees players
Baseball players from Ohio
People from Jefferson County, Ohio
American twins
Twin sportspeople